The following is a timeline of the history of the city of Greensboro, North Carolina, USA.

Prior to 20th century

 1808 – Town of Greensboro established in Guilford County.
 1824 – First Presbyterian Church of Greensboro founded.
 1826 – Patriot newspaper begins publication.
 1827 – Buffalo Presbyterian Church built.
 1834 – Guilford College chartered.
 1873 – Bennett College founded.
 1877 – Chamber of Commerce and Green Hill Cemetery  established.
 1884 – Population: 5,538.
 1889 – Coney Club founded.
 1890 – Daily Record newspaper begins publication.
 1891
 State Normal and Industrial School established.
 Julius I. Foust Building constructed.
 1895 – Greensboro Industrial and Immigration Association founded.
 1900 – Population: 10,035.

20th century

 1902 – Palmer Memorial Institute founded in nearby Sedalia.
 1905 – City Board of Health established.
 1906
 Greensboro Public Library building constructed.
 City Fire Commission established.
 1909
 Greensboro Daily News begins publication.
 Greensboro Country Club founded.
 1917 – Guilford Courthouse National Military Park established.
 1918 – Maplewood Cemetery established.
 1920 – Population: 19,861.
 1922 - United Way of Greater Greensboro is founded under the original name "Greensboro Community Chest".
 1924 – Greensboro Historical Museum established.
 1926
 World War Memorial Stadium dedicated.
 WBIG radio begins broadcasting.
 1927 – Lindley Field (airfield) established.
 1928 – Forest Lawn Cemetery established.
 1931 – Paramount Theatre opens.
 1936 – April: 1936 Cordele–Greensboro tornado outbreak.
 1940 – Population: 59,319.
 1949
 WFMY-TV begins broadcasting.
 Temple Emanuel active.
 1950 – Population: 74,389.
 1957 – June: Simkins v. City of Greensboro decided.
 1959 – Greensboro Coliseum opens.
 1960
 Greensboro sit-ins for civil rights occur.
 Population: 119,574.
 1967
 Greensboro Inner City Ministry established.
 Carolina Peacemaker begins publication.
 1968 – Family Life Council and Greensboro Beautiful nonprofit  established.
 1969
Jack Elam becomes mayor.
May: 1969 Greensboro uprising.
 1970
 Circle Drive-In cinema in business.
 Population: 144,076.
1971 - Jim Melvin becomes mayor.
 1979
 November 3: Greensboro massacre.
 Greensboro Hornets baseball team active.
 1980 – Guilford County Historic Preservation Commission established.
 1981
Aggie Stadium opens.
John Forbis becomes mayor.
 1982 – Airport new terminal built.
 1984 – News & Record newspaper in publication.
 1987 – June: Ku Klux Klan march and opposing protest.
 1990 - Population: 183,521.
1993 - Carolyn Allen becomes the first female mayor of Greensboro.
 1997 – City website online (approximate date).
1999 - Keith Holliday becomes mayor.

21st century

 2005 – NewBridge Bank Park (stadium) opens.
 2007 - Yvonne Johnson becomes first African-American in city elected mayor.
2009 - Bill Knight becomes mayor.
 2010
 International Civil Rights Center and Museum opens.
 Population: 269,666.
2011 - Robbie Perkins becomes mayor.
 2013 – Nancy Vaughan becomes mayor.
 2014 – Jim Westmoreland becomes city manager.
 2015 – Mark Walker becomes U.S. representative for North Carolina's 6th congressional district.

See also
 Greensboro history
 List of mayors of Greensboro, North Carolina
 National Register of Historic Places listings in Guilford County, North Carolina
 Timelines of other cities in North Carolina: Asheville, Charlotte, Durham, Fayetteville, Raleigh, Wilmington, Winston-Salem

References

Bibliography

 
 
 
 Ethel Stephens Arnett. 1955. Greensboro, North Carolina, the county seat of Guilford. Chapel Hill: University of North Carolina Press.
 
 
  (fulltext)
 
 
 Howard E. Covington. 2008. Once upon a city: Greensboro, North Carolina's second century. Greensboro, N.C.: Greensboro Historical Museum, Inc.

External links

 
 
 Items related to Greensboro, North Carolina, various dates (via Digital Public Library of America).
 

 
Greensboro